David Michael Gann CBE is an English engineer and academic. A civil engineer, he is also an academic and consultant, who is particularly interested in innovation. He is also a board member of several organisations, including the London Symphony Orchestra.

Early life and education 
The son of John and Hilary Gann, he was born in Liverpool in 1960 and at the age of two his family moved to Didcot, then to Newbury where he went to St Bartholomew’s School. After studying a BSc in Building Construction and Management at the University of Reading, he obtained a MSc in Science, Technology and Industrialisation and a PhD from the University of Sussex. He currently lives in Hove, East Sussex.

Research interests
Gann is an internationally regarded expert on innovation, publishing widely on the subject and working actively to improve innovation performance in business and government. His career has involved exploring why and how innovation happens, the ways it continually transforms the world we live in, and how it can be managed to produce better outcomes for business, government and society. He mentors start-ups and advises boards on innovation and technology management.

Career

Current roles
He is currently Pro-Vice-Chancellor for Development and External Affairs at Oxford University, where he is also Professor of Innovation & Entrepreneurship at Saïd Business School and Fellow of Magdalen College. Gann is Chairman of the UK Atomic Energy Authority, the UK government's research organisation responsible for the development of nuclear fusion power, a non-executive director of Directa Plus plc, a producer of pristine graphene, and non-executive director of VenCap International plc, a venture fund-of-funds. He is a director of the London Symphony Orchestra and Chairman of LSO Live.

Previous roles
Gann was previously Vice-President (Innovation) at Imperial College London (2013 – 2019) and held a Chair in Innovation and Technology Management at Imperial College Business School from 2003. From 2003 to 2013, he directed the Innovation Studies Centre (ISC) – a ten-year EPSRC-funded programme conducting multi-disciplinary research on the innovation process in the science and engineering industries, from knowledge creation to commercialisation. Prior to that he held the Royal Academy of Engineering Chair in Innovative Manufacturing at the University of Sussex.

He was Group Innovation Executive at Laing O’Rourke plc (2007-2011), establishing digital engineering and advanced manufacturing capabilities, and has formed 5 companies, including the Think Play Do Group, an Imperial College spin-out specialising in innovation strategy and management.

Gann has held a number of non executive and advisory positions, including at the UK Ministry of Defence, Department of Health and Social Care, and Department for Business Energy and Industrial Strategy. He was a member of the London Enterprise Panel and Chairman of the Smart London Board, reporting to the Mayor of London, 2012-2017.

Recognition
Gann was appointed Commander of the Order of the British Empire (CBE) in the 2010 Queen's Birthday Honours for services to engineering. He is the recipient of the 2014 Tjalling C. Koopmans Asset Award, for extraordinary contributions to the economic sciences, and was awarded the Imperial College Medal in 2019.

He is a Chartered Civil Engineer, Fellow of the Institution of Civil Engineers Honorary Fellow of the Royal College of Art, and Fellow of the City and Guilds of London Institute. He was Visiting Professor, University of Southampton between 2001-2006, and has been Honorary Professor in Innovation Management, at the UQ Business School, since 2001. He is Professor Emeritus at Imperial College Business School.

Research and selected publications 
Gann's academic research spans strategy, management science and systems engineering, and he has published work on innovation, entrepreneurship, and technology management in a wide range of industries and sectors. Amongst his key contributions are research into the management of large construction projects, the identification of 'innovation technologies' which intensify the innovation process, and the importance of play in organisations and as a behaviour of entrepreneurs. His books include:

 Demystifying China’s Innovation Machine: Chaotic Order, M. Zhang, M. Dodgson and D. Gann, Oxford University Press, 2022.
 Philanthropy, Innovation and Entrepreneurship: An Introduction, M. Dodgson and D. Gann, Palgrave Macmillan, 2020.
 The Playful Entrepreneur: How to Survive and Thrive in an Uncertain World, M. Dodgson and D. Gann, Yale University Press, 2018. Published in paperback, 2021.
 The Oxford Handbook of Innovation Management, M. Dodgson, D. Gann, N. Phillips, (eds), Oxford, Oxford University Press, 2014.
 Innovation: A Very Short Introduction, M. Dodgson and D. Gann, Oxford, Oxford University Press, 2010. (Translated into Italian, Portuguese, Malay, Arabic, Chinese, Spanish). 2nd edition 2018 (Translated into Spanish).
 The Management of Technological Innovation: Strategy and Practice, M. Dodgson, D. Gann, A. Salter. Oxford, Oxford University Press, 2008.
 Think, Play, Do: Technology, Innovation and Organization, M. Dodgson, D. Gann, A. Salter. Oxford, Oxford University Press, 2005. (Translated into Japanese, Koyo Shobo Publishers, 2007)

Personal life 
His interests include opera, rugby, cricket, skiing, mountain walking, cycling, gardening, and beekeeping.

1960 births
Living people
Alumni of the University of Reading
Alumni of the University of Sussex
British civil engineers
Commanders of the Order of the British Empire